Metriorhynchus is an extinct genus of marine crocodyliform that lived in the oceans during the Late Jurassic. The type species, M. brevirostris was named in 1829 as a species of Steneosaurus before being named as a separate genus by the German palaeontologist Christian von Meyer in 1832. The name Metriorhynchus means "Moderate snout", and is derived from the Greek Metrio- ("moderate") and -rhynchos ("snout").

Discovery and species
Fossil specimens referrable to Metriorhynchus are known from Kimmeridgian (Late Jurassic) deposits of France.

Valid species
Only one valid species is recognized today, the type species M. geoffroyii (now called M. brevirostris). "Metriorhynchus" hastifer and "M." palpebrosus are generically distinct from the Metriorhynchus type species, with hastifer being recovered as a geosaurine. Species in this genus were traditionally classed into two skull groups: longirostrine (long, narrow jaws) and brevirostrine (short, broad jaws). However, most of brevirostrine species have been transferred to the genera Purranisaurus and Suchodus. Metriorhynchus superciliosus has recently been shown to be distinct from the type species, M. brevirostris, and now has its own genus Thalattosuchus.

The genera Purranisaurus and Suchodus have been considered junior synonyms of Metriorhynchus. Recent phylogenetic analyses however, do not support the monophyly of Metriorhynchus, as conceived off in the 1860s-2010.

Eudes-Deslongchamps (1867–69) recognized four Callovian species of Metriorhynchus: M. superciliosus, M. moreli, M. blainvillei, and M. brachyrhynchus. Later, Andrews (1913) considered there to be seven valid species: M. superciliosus, M. moreli, M. brachyrhynchus, M. durobrivensis, M. cultridens, M. leedsi and M. laeve. However, Adams-Tresman (1987), using linear morphometrics, could only distinguish between the two skull groups, so she found there to be two species from the Oxford Clay, M. superciliosus and M. brachyrhynchus. Vignaud (1997) however, considered there to be three Callovian species: M. superciliosus, M. brachyrhynchus and M. leedsi, and a 2022 study describing a new metriorhynchid specimen advocated returning to this taxonomic system, considering Gracilineustes and Thalattosuchus junior synonyms of Metriorhynchus.

Unnamed species
Fragmentary remains attributed to Metriorhynchus are known from South America during the Bajocian and Bathonian (both Middle Jurassic). However, phylogenetic analysis has shown that these species cannot be referred to Metriorhynchus.

See also

List of marine reptiles

References

Late Jurassic crocodylomorphs of Europe
Prehistoric pseudosuchian genera
Prehistoric marine crocodylomorphs
Late Jurassic genus extinctions
Thalattosuchians
Fossil taxa described in 1832